Jay Nordlinger (born November 21, 1963) is an American journalist. He is a senior editor of National Review, and a book fellow of the National Review Institute. He is also a music critic for The New Criterion and The Conservative.

In the 1990s, Nordlinger worked for The Weekly Standard magazine. In the 2000s, he was music critic for the New York Sun.

Early life
Nordlinger grew up in Ann Arbor, Michigan, which he refers to as a left-leaning "Citadel of the Left," and opines about in his political columns. His father worked in the education sector and his mother was an artist. He graduated from the University of Michigan.

Career
Since 2002, he has hosted a series of public interviews at the Salzburg Festival.  With Mona Charen, he hosted the Need to Know podcast, and he also hosts a podcast called "Q&A."  In 2011, he filmed The Human Parade, with Jay Nordlinger, a TV series bringing hour-long interviews with various personalities.

In 2007, National Review Books published Here, There & Everywhere: Collected Writings of Jay Nordlinger, comprising some 100 pieces on various subjects.  In 2012, Encounter Books published Peace, They Say: A History of the Nobel Peace Prize, the Most Famous and Controversial Prize in the World. In 2015, Encounter Books published Children of Monsters: An Inquiry into the Sons and Daughters of Dictators.  In 2016, National Review Books published a second anthology of Nordlinger's essays and articles, titled Digging In: Further Collected Writings of Jay Nordlinger.

Awards
In 2001, Nordlinger received the Eric Breindel Award for Excellence in Opinion Journalism, a now defunct annual award at one time given by Rupert MurdochsNews Corporation, in honor of late editorial-page editor of NYPost. It was meant to go to a journalist who according to NYpost editors now defunct foundation demonstrates "love of country and its democratic institutions" and "bears witness to the evils of totalitarianism."

Also in 2001, Nordlinger has claimed to have won an “annual award of the Chan Foundation for Journalism and Culture”. The award and the foundation, he claims, were established in honor of Zhu Xi Chan, the Hong Kong newspaper owner whose pages covered events in Chairman Mao Zedong's China. The award is intended for a journalist "who uses his talents to work for freedom and democracy in China." There is not reliable information available online about the “award” or “foundation” beyond Nordlinger's own Bio and personal claims.

Personal life
Nordlinger is a fan of the Detroit Pistons, and lives in New York City.

References

External links

 
 Nordlinger's profile at National Review Online
 Archive of Nordlinger's writings  at the New York Sun.
 Archive of Nordlinger's writings at The New Criterion.
 

Writers from Ann Arbor, Michigan
1963 births
Living people
American columnists
American male journalists
Journalists from Michigan
American magazine editors
American music critics
American music journalists
American political writers
Michigan Republicans
New York (state) Republicans
New York (state) Independents
The New York Sun people
University of Michigan alumni
National Review people
American speechwriters